The sharpnose guitarfish (Glaucostegus granulatus) is a species of ray in the Rhinobatidae family.

It is found near Australia, India, Indonesia, Kuwait, Myanmar, Pakistan, Papua New Guinea, the Philippines, Sri Lanka, Thailand, Vietnam, and possibly China and Oman. Its natural habitats are open seas, coral reefs, and estuarine waters. It ranges from intertidal to offshore continental shelves down to 119 m. The sharpnose guitarfish feeds on large shellfish.

References

External links
Catalogue of Life listing

sharpnose guitarfish
Sharpnose guitarfish
Sharpnose guitarfish
Taxonomy articles created by Polbot